The Battle of Halani was fought in 1783 between the Baloch tribe of Talpurs and the Sindhi tribe of Kalhora near Halani village for the control of the Sindh region, in modern-day Pakistan. The Talpurs, led by Mir Fateh Ali Khan Talpur, won the battle over Mian Abdul Nabi Kalhoro of the Kalhora dynasty, and established the Talpur dynasty.

The Kalhora dynasty of Nawabs were supported by the Durrani Empire. While the Talpurs traced their roots back to Nader Shah had Qajar and possibly slight nominal support from the Mughal Empire.

At the Battle of Halani both sides ferociously deployed the usage of gunpowder weaponry. The battle was described by a future chronicler with one word Atishfishan (meaning "blazing flame"), this battle was even fought between gunboats in the Indus river.

The Talpur dynasty ruled in Sindh until defeated by the British forces at the Battle of Miani in 1843. 2 of 3 Talpur kingdoms were defeated but Khairpur survived by allying with the British.

References

Halani
History of Sindh
Halani
Talpur dynasty
Conflicts in 1782